Paul A. Friedrichs is a United States Air Force major general serving as the command surgeon of the Joint Staff. He previously served as command surgeon of Air Combat Command.

Assignments
June 1990 – June 1991, Surgical Intern, Wilford Hall Medical Center, Lackland AFB, Texas
July 1991 – June 1992, General Medical Officer, Wilford Hall Medical Center, Lackland AFB, Texas
June 1992 – June 1997, Urological Surgery Resident, Wilford Hall Medical Center, Lackland AFB, Texas
July 1997 – October 1997, Assistant Chief, Urology, 89th MDG, Andrews AFB, Md.
November 1997 – September 1999, Chief, Urology, 89th MDG, Andrews AFB, Md.
October 1999 – September 2000, Chief, Population Health Management, 89th MDG, Andrews AFB, Md.
October 2000 – July 2001, Analyst, Health Benefits and Policy Division, Office of the Surgeon General, Headquarters Air Force, Bolling AFB, Washington, D.C.
August 2001 – June 2002, Chief, Operations Branch, Office of the Surgeon General, Headquarters Air Force, Bolling AFB, Washington, D.C.
July 2002 – May 2003, Chief, Optimization and Integration Division, Air Force Medical Operations Agency (AFMOA), Bolling AFB, Washington, D.C.
May 2003 – May 2005, Commander, 56th Medical Operations Squadron, Luke AFB, Ariz. (September 2004 – January 2005, Commander, 332nd Expeditionary Aeromedical Operations Squadron, Balad Air Base, Iraq)
June 2005 – April 2006, Chief, Aeromedical and Clinical Services Branches, Headquarters Air Force Space Command, Peterson AFB, Colo.
May 2006 – July 2007, Chief, Medical Operations Division, Headquarters Air Force Space Command, Peterson AFB, Colo.
August 2007 – June 2008, Student, National War College, Fort McNair, Washington, D.C.
August 2008 – July 2010, Commander, 3rd Medical Group, 3rd Wing, Elmendorf AFB, Alaska
July 2010 – July 2011, Commander, 673d Medical Group, 673rd Air Base Wing, JB Elmendorf-Richardson, Alaska
July 2011 – July 2014, Command Surgeon, HQ Pacific Air Forces, JB Pearl Harbor- Hickam, Hawaii
July 2014 – June 2016, Vice Commander, AFMOA, JB San Antonio, Lackland, Texas
January 2015 – June 2015, Chair, Joint Task Force on High Reliability Organizations, Office of the Assistance Secretary of Defense for Health Affairs, Washington, D.C.
June 2016 – July 2018, Command Surgeon, US Transportation Command, Scott AFB, Ill.
July 2018– July 2019, Air Combat Command (ACC), Command Surgeon, JB Langley-Eustis, Va.
July 2019–present, Joint Staff Surgeon, the Pentagon, Arlington, Va.

Effective dates of promotion

References

Living people
Place of birth missing (living people)
Recipients of the Defense Superior Service Medal
Recipients of the Legion of Merit
Tulane University alumni
Uniformed Services University of the Health Sciences alumni
United States Air Force generals
United States Air Force personnel of the Iraq War
Year of birth missing (living people)